Kwail Airport(과일비행장) is an airport in Kwail, Hwanghae-namdo, North Korea.

Facilities 
The airfield has a single concrete runway 15/33 measuring 8150 x 148 feet (2484 x 45 m).  It has a full-length parallel taxiway with aprons on each end, as well as a taxiway extending 1.7 km to the south to dispersed or underground aircraft shelters.  It is home to a fighter regiment of 44 MiG-21 jets.

References 

Airports in North Korea